Moshekwa Langa (born 1975) is a South African visual artist whose work includes painting, drawing, sculpture, performance, video, and photography.

Biography
Moshekwa Langa was born in South Africa in 1975. He began studying art history around the age of 15, which made him want to become an artist. Some time after high school, he came to view making art as an opportunity to become part of an "ongoing story." He studied at the Rijksakademie van Beeldende Kunsten (the State Academy of Fine Arts) in Amsterdam.

Career
Langa has said about his work, "If I had to explain what I do to someone, I would say I make kind of dreamscapes…I try to record aspects of waking and sleeping time." One critic said his work "has interrogated land and public and personal politics through the mapping of territory and cultural environments."

Selected solo exhibitions
 2013. Counterpoints. Krannert Art Museum, University of Illinois, Champaign, Illinois.
 2017. Fugitive. Stevenson Gallery, Johannesburg, South Africa.
 2018. Relatives. Blain Southern Gallery, London, United Kingdom.
 2019. Tropic of Capricorn. Stevenson Gallery, Cape Town, South Africa.

Selected group exhibitions
 1999. Generation Z. Museum of Modern Art, New York City, New York.
 2002. The Short Century: Independence and Liberation Movements in Africa, 1945–1994.Museum of Modern Art, New York City, New York.
 2003. How Latitudes Become Forms: Art in a Global Age. Walker Art Center, Minneapolis, Minnesota.
 2011. Impressions from South Africa, 1965 to Now. Museum of Modern Art, New York City, New York.

References 

1975 births
South African artists
Living people